The Israeli Technology and Maintenance Corps (Heil HaTekhnologya VeHaAhzaka) is a combat-support corps in the IDF GOC Army Headquarters. Before the Israeli Technological and Logistics Directorate was dismantled, it fell under its jurisdiction. The corps is responsible for the development and maintenance of war materiel, combat-support materials, and other systems.

History
In 1941, the Haganah's Ordnance Department (Mahleket Himush, abbr. Mahash) was founded. It engaged in the purchasing, concealment, and transport of materiel, in cooperation with Israel Military Industries (created in 1933). It was headed by Asher "Oshraka" Peled, who also served in the British army. The Ordnance Department sold concealed weapons to the Yishuv, in accordance with the budget of each village. The British wrote that "There is a weapon to arm every combatant". The first ordnance course took place in Ju'ara (the Haganah's central training camp) in 1942, and in 1943 another course was held in Ruhama.

In January 1948, the Ordnance Department was renamed into the Ordnance Service. During the 1948 Arab–Israeli War, the service's first "Basic Workshops" were established to help restore and improve vehicles. In 1951, the Engineering Corps was renamed into the Ordnance Corps.

During the Suez War, the corps rescued, collected and restored materiel. After the war, the first Ordnance Battalion was created. In the War of Attrition, the corps engaged in many rescue attempts. During the Yom Kippur War, the corps was able to restore and bring into service damaged war materiel (the pace of the restoration proved decisive). During the 1982 Lebanon War, the corps designated two regional ordnance unit within Lebanon, and the Merkava tank, developed under the corps and manufactured by the IMI, was tested in battle for the first time.

Following the Al-Aqsa Intifada (2000), new defenses were added to Armoured fighting vehicles, and several vehicles underwent upgrades, among these: upper turrets for the Nagmachon, Achzarit, and Centurion tank-chassis Puma CEV; mini-turrets for Merkava tanks; further defences to the IDF Caterpillar D9 (added cage armor); and the development of the "Scorpion," a Landing Bridge tank converted into a combat engineering tank able to carry a portable pillbox.

In 2016, the corps' name was changed from Ordnance Corps (Heil HaHimush) to Technology and Maintenance Corps.

Structure
The corps' training base (#20) is located in Tzrifin. Other units do not fall directly under the corps’ command, but are professionally affiliated with it:

The Center for Maintenance and Restoration is the main centre for holding war materiel, including the factory where the Merkava tank is manufactured. 
The Center for Combat Spare Parts administers the supply of spare parts to the IDF in ten bases.
The Unit for Quality Assurance and Experiments conducts quality control and other experiments in two principal experiment bases and several other smaller, temporary bases.
The Central Regional Ordnance Supply Unit 650 (formerly 652) provides ordnance to the Central Command, including forces stationed in the West Bank.
The Northern Regional Ordnance Supply Unit 651 provides ordnance to the Northern Command.
The Southern Regional Ordnance Supply Unit 653 provides ordnance to the Southern Command.

Commanders
Below is a list of all Chief Ordnance Officers:

References

Bibliography

External links
Overview at IDF official website

Corps of Israel